André Ehrenberg (born 2 January 1972 in Braunschweig) is a German slalom canoeist who competed at the international level from 1990 to 2003. Competing in two Summer Olympics, he won a bronze medal in the C2 event in Atlanta in 1996.

Ehrenberg also won five medals at the ICF Canoe Slalom World Championships with three silvers (C2: 1997, C2 team: 2002, 2003) and two bronzes (C2 team: 1995, 1997). He earned two more medals at the European Championships (1 gold and 1 bronze).

His partner in the boat throughout the whole of his C2 career was Michael Senft.

World Cup individual podiums

References

DatabaseOlympics.com profile
42-83 from Medal Winners ICF updated 2007.pdf?MenuID=Results/1107/0,Medal_winners_since_1936/1510/0 ICF medalists for Olympic and World Championships - Part 2: rest of flatwater (now sprint) and remaining canoeing disciplines: 1936-2007.

1972 births
Canoeists at the 1996 Summer Olympics
Canoeists at the 2000 Summer Olympics
German male canoeists
Living people
Olympic canoeists of Germany
Olympic bronze medalists for Germany
Olympic medalists in canoeing
Sportspeople from Braunschweig
Medalists at the 1996 Summer Olympics
Medalists at the ICF Canoe Slalom World Championships